Ono no Oyu (?-737) was a Japanese bureaucrat and a poet.  He served under Ōtomo no Tabito during the Dazaifu administration.  He rose to the rank of Assistant Governor-General (daini).  Three of his tanka poems have been preserved in the Man'yōshū.

Tanka poem

・Awoni-yoshi Nara-no Miyako-ha Sakuhana-no  Nihofuga-gotoku Ima-sakari-nari（Manyoushu 3-328）

means : In beautiful green, Here in Capital Nara, Spring flowers are now in full bloom.

Year of birth unknown
737 deaths
Japanese government officials
Japanese poets